James Thomas Cannida II (born January 3, 1975) is a former American football defensive lineman who last played for the Dallas Desperados (2005–2007) in the Arena Football League. He also played in the National Football League for the Tampa Bay Buccaneers (1998–2001) and the Indianapolis Colts (2002). Cannida is currently the seventh grade head football coach at Scoggins Middle School in Frisco Independent School District.

High school years
Cannida attended American High School in Fremont, California and was a student and a letterman in football and basketball. In football, he was an All-League selection and an All-East Bay selection.

Notes

External links
 Dallas Desperados bio
 NFL.com bio

1975 births
Living people
People from Fremont, California
Players of American football from California
Players of American football from Savannah, Georgia
Sportspeople from Alameda County, California
American football defensive tackles
American football offensive linemen
Nevada Wolf Pack football players
Tampa Bay Buccaneers players
Indianapolis Colts players
Dallas Desperados players